The Ministry of Civil Aviation and Communication Maldives is a ministry of the government of Maldives. The ministry's job is to ensure a safe transport network domestically and internationally.

The Accident Investigation Coordination Committee (AICC), subordinate to the ministry, investigates aviation accidents and incidents in the Maldives.

See also
 Maldives Civil Aviation Authority

References

Aviation organisations based in the Maldives
Government of the Maldives
Organizations investigating aviation accidents and incidents
Civil aviation in the Maldives